Mitchell Landsberg is an American journalist and newspaper editor. He is the senior editor for enterprise of the Los Angeles Times. He was previously a foreign and national editor.

Landsberg was born November 1, 1953 in Sacramento, California. He received a bachelor's degree in history from UCLA in 1976. 

After graduation he worked at the Beverly Hills Independent and the Ukiah Daily Journal. In 1980 he went to work for the Associated Press, where he was a reporter, editor, and foreign correspondent for 19 years, moving to the Times in 1999. At the Times he reported on local and national politics, including coverage of the 2000 Florida recount, the 2003 California gubernatorial recall election, and the 2010 Haiti earthquake.  

Landsberg was one of three journalists cited by name when the 2004 Pulitzer Prize for Breaking News Reporting was given to the Los Angeles Times for "compelling and comprehensive coverage of the massive wildfires that imperiled a populated region of southern California." He was the lead writer for a 70-member team covering the fire stories.  The next year, his reporting contributed to the newspaper's winning of the 2005 Pulitzer Prize for Public Service. He and three other reporters were credited for a "courageous, exhaustively researched series exposing deadly medical problems and racial injustice at a major public hospital", the King/Drew Medical Center.

References

1953 births
Living people
People from Sacramento, California
People from Los Angeles
University of California, Los Angeles alumni
Los Angeles Times people
Pulitzer Prize winners for journalism